Violent Road, also known as Hell's Highway, is a 1958 American film directed by Howard W. Koch, written by Richard H. Landau, and starring Brian Keith, Dick Foran, Efrem Zimbalist, Jr., Merry Anders, Sean Garrison and Joanna Barnes. A remake of The Wages of Fear, it was released by Warner Bros. on April 11, 1958.

Plot

An out-of-control test rocket causes death and destruction and requires the relocation of the rocket development plant.  Trucker Mitch Barton (Brian Keith) assembles a team of several other men for a nearly suicidal mission to drive three trucks to move the rocket fuel—hydrazine, nitric acid, and concentrated hydrogen peroxide—safely over a rough mountain road within three days. Fuel developer George Lawrence (Efrem Zimbalist, Jr.) feels responsible for a safe passage and comes along.

The men take the dangerous job for an exorbitant fee of 5,000 dollars each and discuss what they will do with the money. When his brother Ben is too drunk to drive, race car driver Ken takes his place. Frank Miller, determined to provide for his nagging wife, takes the job.  He prevents a possible explosion by closing a valve on a nitric oxide tank with his bare hand and dies of his injuries.

Detoured by breakdowns, fatigue and a treacherous terrain, plus a runaway school bus, Mitch and the men arrive at their destination and receive their pay.

Cast 
 Brian Keith as Mitch Barton
 Dick Foran as Frank 'Sarge' Miller
 Efrem Zimbalist, Jr. as George Lawrence
 Merry Anders as Carrie 
 Sean Garrison as Ken Farley
 Joanna Barnes as Peg Lawrence
 Perry Lopez as Manuelo
 Arthur Batanides as Ben
 Ed Prentiss as Mr. Nelson
 Ann Doran as Edith Miller
 John Dennis as Pat Farley

References

External links 
 
 
 
 

1958 films
1950s English-language films
American adventure comedy films
1950s adventure comedy films
American remakes of French films
Trucker films
Films directed by Howard W. Koch
Films scored by Leith Stevens
Warner Bros. films
1958 comedy films
Henri-Georges Clouzot
1950s American films